Anthony or Tony Wilson may refer to:

Anthony Wilson
 Anthony Wilson (musician) (born 1968), jazz guitarist and composer
 Anthony Wilson (album), 1997
 Anthony Wilson (sprinter) (born 1968), Canadian sprinter
 Anthony Wilson (MP), British politician during 1850s
 Anthony Babington Wilson (born 1931), business executive, artist and author
 Deke Arlon, musician/manager, born Anthony Howard Wilson
 Henry Bromley (writer) (1750–1814), real name Anthony Wilson, writer on art
 A. Dash Wilson (1898–?), Liberian politician

Tony Wilson
 Tony Wilson (1950–2007), TV presenter, co-founder of Factory Records
 Tony Wilson (boxer) (born 1964), British boxer
 Tony Wilson (British Army officer) (born 1935)
 Tony Wilson (musician) (born 1947), member of Hot Chocolate
 Tony Wilson (radio presenter), Australian author and radio presenter, 2000s